The 2023 Men's Junior AHF Cup is the sixth edition of the Men's Junior AHF Cup, the qualification tournament for the Men's Hockey Junior Asia Cup organized by the Asian Hockey Federation.

It was held at the Sultan Qaboos Sports Complex in Muscat, Oman from 6 to 12 January 2023. The top four teams qualified for the 2023 Junior Asia Cup.

Teams
The following teams participated in the tournament.

Preliminary round
All times are local, GST (UTC+4).

Pool A

Pool B

Fifth to eight place classification

Bracket

Semi-finals

Seventh and eighth place

Fifth and sixth place

First to fourth place classification

Bracket

Semi-finals

Third and fourth place

Final

Statistics

Final standings

Awards

See also
 2022 Women's Junior AHF Cup

References

Junior AHF Cup
Junior AHF Cup
Sport in Muscat, Oman
International field hockey competitions hosted by Oman
Junior AHF Cup
AHF Cup
21st century in Muscat, Oman
Men's Junior AHF Cup